Richard Dunphy (1939 – November 2006) was an Irish hurler who played as a goalkeeper for the Kilkenny senior team.

Born in Waterford, Dunphy first arrived on the inter-county scene at the age of twenty-two when he first linked up with the Kilkenny senior team. He joined the senior panel during the 1961–62 league. Dunphy spent his entire career as understudy goalkeeper to Ollie Walsh, however, he won one Leinster medal and two National Hurling League medals as an unused substitute.

At club level Dunphy was a one-time championship medallist with Mooncoin.

Dunphy's father, Eddie, his uncles, Joe, William and Wattie, and his brother, Joe, all played for Kilkenny at different stages.

He retired from inter-county hurling following the conclusion of the 1966 championship.

In retirement from playing Dunphy became involved in the administrative affairs of the Gaelic Athletic Association, serving as treasurer and trustee with the Kilkenny County Board. He also served as a Fianna Fáil county councilor with Kilkenny County Council.

Honours

Player

Mooncoin
Kilkenny Senior Hurling Championship (1): 1965

Kilkenny
Leinster Senior Hurling Championship (1): 1966 (sub)
National Hurling League (2): 1961–62 (sub), 1965–66 (sub)

References

1939 births
2006 deaths
Mooncoin hurlers
Kilkenny inter-county hurlers
Hurling goalkeepers
Fianna Fáil politicians
Local councillors in County Kilkenny